Hultgren is a surname of Swedish origin meaning 'Forest Branch'.

Geographical distribution
As of 2014, 51.3% of all known bearers of the surname Hultgren were residents of Sweden (frequency 1:3,116), 39.1% of the United States (1:150,084), 2.8% of Norway (1:29,725), 2.3% of Australia (1:169,813) and 1.9% of Argentina (1:374,943).

In Sweden, the frequency of the surname was higher than national average (1:3,116) in the following counties:
 1. Kalmar County (1:1,079)
 2. Östergötland County (1:1,552)
 3. Jönköping County (1:1,720)
 4. Värmland County (1:1,862)
 5. Blekinge County (1:1,974)
 6. Gotland County (1:2,017)
 7. Kronoberg County (1:2,392)
 8. Örebro County (1:2,769)
 9. Västra Götaland County (1:2,889)
 10. Dalarna County (1:2,977)
 11. Västmanland County (1:2,981)

People
Anne Hultgren, American scientist
Axel Hultgren, (1886-1974), Metallography Professor, Royal Institute of Technology, Stockholm, Sweden
Chayne Hultgren, known as the Space Cowboy (Australian Circus and Freak show performer)
David Hultgren, American politician and judge in Illinois  
Edvard Hultgren  (1904 –1984), Swedish boxer who competed in the 1924 Summer Olympics
Kristoffer Hultgren, atmospheric scientist, Stockholm University, Sweden  
Petra Hultgren, Swedish actress and Miss Sweden 1995
Ralph Raymond Hultgren (1905-1993), Metallurgy Professor UC Berkeley and Author
Ralph Hultgren, Australian trumpet player and composer. 
Randy Hultgren, American politician, Illinois Representative
Steven Hultgren, Irish Music Producer

References

Swedish-language surnames